The 2012–13 Professional U21 Development League (League 1 referred to as the Barclays Under 21 Premier League for sponsorship reasons ) was the inaugural season of the Professional Development League's U21 competition.

There were 45 participating teams in the 2012–13 Professional U21 Development Leagues; 22 in League 1 and 23 in League 2 (12 in the North Division, 11 in the South Division).

League 1

First Group Stage
The top three teams in Groups 1, the top two teams in Group 2 and 3, and the best third-placed team from Group 2 and 3 will go forward to the Elite Group Stage.

The remaining third-placed team, and the fourth and fifth-placed teams from all three groups, will go forward to Qualification Group Tier One Stage. The sixth and seventh-placed teams, and the eighth-placed team from Group 1, will go forward to the Qualification Group Tier Two Stage.

Group 1

Table

Results

Group 2

Table

Results

Group 3

Table

Results

Best-placed third-place team

Second phase

Elite Group

Table

Results

Qualification Group Tier 1

Table

Results

Qualification Group Tier 2

Table

Results

Knockout stage

The teams finishing first in the two Qualification Groups played each other to decide who makes the semi-final against the winner of the Elite Group Stage.

The teams finishing second and third in the Elite Group Stage played in the other semi-final.

Play-off

Semi-final

Final

League 2

Group stage

North division

South division

Knockout stage

The teams finishing first in each division will play a semi-final against the runners-up of the opposite division, with the winners of each semi-final contesting a final to crown the overall champions of the combined League.

See also
2012–13 FA Youth Cup
2012–13 Premier League
2012–13 in English football

References

2012-13
2012–13 in English football leagues